Working Girl is an American sitcom television series that aired on NBC from April 16 to July 30, 1990. Loosely based on the 1988 film of the same name starring Melanie Griffith, the series stars Sandra Bullock as Tess McGill (Melanie Griffith's character in the film), in a role that was initially meant for Nancy McKeon.

Synopsis
Tess McGill is a spunky, independent secretary who has suddenly become a junior executive after she charms company owner A.J. Trask. Tess' first challenge is to survive working with her antagonistic, uptight immediate boss, Mrs. Bryn Newhouse, otherwise known as the "company witch." Tess's best friend, Lana Peters, is a secretary who is more interested in doing her nails and rooting for Tess than in getting ahead herself. Meanwhile, Everett Rutledge is a fellow junior executive who is charming but eager to please. Libby Wentworth is Tess's world-wise "permanent temporary" secretary who is also a moonlighting musician. Back home each night on Staten Island, Tess has to contend with her doting parents, Joe and Fran. Tess also has to contend with Sal Pascarella, the blue-collar neighborhood Romeo who constantly pursues her.

Reception and cancelation
Debuting as a midseason replacement, Working Girl drew low ratings and was canceled after eight of the twelve episodes produced aired.

Cast
Sandra Bullock as Tess McGill 
Patrick Brock as Office Regular 
Nana Visitor as Bryn Newhouse 
Judy Prescott as Lana Peters 
George Newbern as Everett Rutledge 
Eyde Byrde as Libby Wentworth  
Tom O'Rourke as A.J. Trask 
Anthony Tyler Quinn as Sal Pascarella 
David Schramm as Joe McGill  
B.J. Ward as Fran McGill

Episodes

Production notes
The series was created by Kimberly Hill and Tom Patchett. Kenneth Kaufman and Tom Patchett served as executive producers.

"Let the River Run" (which was also featured in the motion picture) was the series' theme song.

Syndication
The series briefly reran on TV Land in the 1990s after Bullock became a major motion-picture star.

References

External links 
 

1990 American television series debuts
1990 American television series endings
1990s American sitcoms
1990s American workplace comedy television series
English-language television shows
NBC original programming
Live action television shows based on films
Television series by 20th Century Fox Television
Television shows set in New York City